Edwardsburg is a village within Ontwa Township in Cass County in the U.S. state of Michigan, northeast of South Bend.  The population was 1,259 at the 2010 census. It is part of the South Bend–Mishawaka, IN-MI, Metropolitan Statistical Area.

History
Edwardsburg was established in 1828 in an area that had previously been known as Beardsley's Prairie.  It was incorporated as a village in 1911, and is named after Abraham Edwards, a politician and early settler of the area.

Geography

Demographics

2010 census
As of the census of 2010, there were 1,259 people, 517 households, and 332 families living in the village. The racial makeup of the village was 93.6% White, 1.5% African American, 0.8% Native American, 0.2% Asian, 0.3% Pacific Islander, 1.0% from other races, and 2.5% from two or more races. Hispanic or Latino of any race were 3.2% of the population.

There were 517 households, of which 35.2% had children under the age of 18 living with them, 38.9% were married couples living together, 18.4% had a female householder with no husband present, 7.0% had a male householder with no wife present, and 35.8% were non-families. 29.8% of all households were made up of individuals, and 10.6% had someone living alone who was 65 years of age or older. The average household size was 2.44 and the average family size was 2.98.

in the village was 36.1 years. 28.4% of residents were under the age of 18; 7.7% were between the ages of 18 and 24; 24.1% were from 25 to 44; 26.7% were from 45 to 64; and 13.2% were 65 years of age or older. The gender makeup of the village was 46.2% male and 53.8% female.

2000 census
As of the census of 2000, there were 1,147 people, 507 households, and 319 families living in the village. The racial makeup of the village was 94.94% White, 0.17% Black or African American, 2.35% Native American, 0.17% Asian, 0.44% from other races, and 1.92% from two or more races. Hispanic or Latino of any race were 0.96% of the population.

There were 507 households, out of which 30.8% had children under the age of 18 living with them, 43.8% were married couples living together, 13.2% had a female householder with no husband present, and 36.9% were non-families. 31.4% of all households were made up of individuals, and 14.4% had someone living alone who was 65 years of age or older.  The average household size was 2.26 and the average family size was 2.78.

In the village, the population was spread out, with 25.5% under the age of 18, 8.0% from 18 to 24, 31.3% from 25 to 44, 20.8% from 45 to 64, and 14.4% who were 65 years of age or older.  The median age was 37 years. For every 100 females, there were 96.4 males.  For every 100 females age 18 and over, there were 97.9 males.

The median income for a household in the village was $33,359, and the median income for a family was $37,132. Males had a median income of $32,969 versus $21,319 for females. The per capita income for the village was $18,842.  About 8.7% of families and 11.3% of the population were below the poverty line, including 13.9% of those under age 18 and 8.6% of those age 65 or over.

Transportation

Edwardsburg is situated at the crossroads of M-62, and US 12.  The Canadian National railroad tracks run through the village. The village is serviced by the Niles Amtrak Station, and the South Bend International Airport, both of which are in the greater Michiana area.  The Indiana Toll Road (I-80/90), runs East-West three miles (5 km) south of the village.

Notable people
 Becky Breisch - track and field athlete
 Mark Kaminsky - professor and tourist detained by Soviet Union in 1960
 Megan and Liz - musicians
Ruby Soho - professional wrestler
Diane Seuss - poet

References

External links 
 Ontwa Township - community site

Villages in Cass County, Michigan
Villages in Michigan
South Bend – Mishawaka metropolitan area
1911 establishments in Michigan